Pietro Marascalchi (1 August 1931 – 16 April 2019) was an Italian wrestler. He competed in the men's freestyle heavyweight at the 1960 Summer Olympics.

References

External links
 

1931 births
2019 deaths
Italian male sport wrestlers
Olympic wrestlers of Italy
Wrestlers at the 1960 Summer Olympics
Sportspeople from Venice